J. B. Wells is an American football coach. He was the first head football coach at Endicott College in Beverly, Massachusetts, serving from 2003 to 2014.  Wells was the head football coach at Bowdoin College in Brunswick, Maine from 2015 to 2018.

Head coaching record

College

References

Year of birth missing (living people)
Living people
Bates Bobcats football coaches
Bowdoin Polar Bears football coaches
Brown Bears football coaches
Chicago Maroons football coaches
Endicott Gulls football coaches
Illinois Wesleyan Titans football coaches
Trinity Bantams football coaches
Trinity Bantams football players
High school football coaches in Connecticut